Ulrich Luz (23 February 1938 – 13 October 2019) was a Swiss theologian and professor emeritus at the University of Bern.

Early life
He was born on 23 February 1938 in Männedorf. He studied Protestant theology in Zurich, Göttingen and Basel under Hans Conzelmann, Eduard Schweizer and Gerhard Ebeling.

Academic career
He taught at the International Christian University in Tokyo from 1970 to 1971. From 1972 to 1980 he was professor for New Testament studies at Göttingen University. He was the New Testament professor at the University of Bern in Switzerland until his retirement in 2003.

Much of his research focused on the Gospel of Matthew and was made available in English in the Hermeneia commentary on the Gospel, which was released in three volumes over a period of more than 20 years. Luz served as president of the Studiorum Novi Testamenti Societas in 1998.

Personal life
He and his wife, Salome Keller, had three children.

Honours
Luz had seven honorary doctorates. He received one of them in 2006 from the Faculty of Theology at Uppsala University. In 2010, he was awarded the Burkitt Medal by the British Academy 'in recognition of special service to Biblical Studies'.

Works

Thesis

Books

as Editor

References

 German Wikipedia

2019 deaths
1938 births
Academic staff of the University of Bern
Swiss biblical scholars
New Testament scholars
Academic staff of the University of Göttingen
People from Meilen District